The ECW Maryland Championship was a short-lived title in Eastern Championship Wrestling, later known as Extreme Championship Wrestling. It was also known as NWA Maryland Heavyweight Championship, and only existed from 1993 to early 1994.

Reigns

References

Extreme Championship Wrestling championships
State professional wrestling championships

ja:ECW王座